The Taiwan University System (TUS) was a university alliance in Taiwan.  Its constituents were:
 National Taiwan University
 National Cheng Kung University
 National Chengchi University
 National Sun Yat-sen University

See also
List of universities in Taiwan
University alliances in Taiwan

University systems in Taiwan